Mari Andrew is an American writer and illustrator. Her illustration career started as a hobby in 2015 when she pursued it as a form of self-expression. Andrew is a New York Times best-selling author of two books.

Career

Books 
Andrew's first book, Am I There Yet?: The Loop-de-loop, Zigzagging Journey to Adulthood, was published by Clarkson Potter on March 27, 2018. Getting There, a guided workbook and companion to Am I There Yet?, followed in April 2019. She has since released her second novel of essays and illustrations, My Inner Sky, published by Penguin Random House on March 2, 2021.

Am I There Yet? received global praise and was recognized on the 2018 New York Times Best Sellers list. Rachel Brosnahan will be producing Mari Andrew's Am I There Yet? as a comedy series through Amazon Studios. The series is written by screenwriter Camilla Blackett, and produced by Alexandrea Zimbler Smith, Paige Simpson, Brosnahan, and Andrew herself.

Andrew's career also includes a series of book tours and workshops on "creativity, healing, and personal resilience". Such workshops on writing and illustration are organized through Skillshare.

References

External links 
 

Writers from New York City
Artists from New York City
Living people
American illustrators
American women illustrators
1986 births
21st-century American women